Maxwell Clark is an American baseball outfielder and pitcher.

Career
Clark began playing baseball as a child in his local Little League before he began playing travel baseball with the Indiana Bulls, an Indiana travel team featuring alumni such as Scott Rolen, Tucker Barnhart, and Lance Lynn. He committed to play college baseball at Vanderbilt University.

Clark attends Franklin Community High School in Franklin, Indiana, where he plays on their baseball team as an outfielder and pitcher. He also plays on their football team as a wide receiver. As a sophomore in 2021, he was named the Indiana Gatorade Baseball Player of the Year after batting .450 with six home runs, thirty RBIs, and 31 stolen bases alongside pitching to a 0.84 ERA and 120 strikeouts over fifty innings. As a junior on the football field, he caught 25 passes for 547 yards and four touchdowns. During his junior year on the baseball team, he batted .577 with nine home runs, 32 RBIs, 31 walks, and 22 stolen bases and was named the Indiana Gatorade Baseball Player of the Year for the second straight season. That summer, he participated in the Prospect Development Pipeline League at the USA Baseball National Training Complex in Cary, North Carolina. He also played for Team USA in the WBSC U-18 World Cup, helping lead the team to a gold medal with a .294 batting average over eight games, and played in the Perfect Game All-American Classic at Chase Field. Clark entered his senior year as the top high school draft prospect for the upcoming MLB draft.

References

Living people
Baseball players from Indiana
Baseball outfielders
Year of birth missing (living people)